The 2004 Australian Formula 3 Championship was a CAMS sanctioned national motor racing championship open to Australian Formula 3 cars. The championship, which was the fourth Australian Formula 3 Championship, was organised and administered by Formula 3 Australia Inc.

Western Australian racer Karl Reindler took a narrow three point championship victory driving a Dallara F301 for South Australian-based motor racing team, Team BRM. Reindler took the win over Queensland driver Chris Gilmour.

Calendar
The championship was contested over an eight-round series.

Classes
Cars competed in two classes:.
 The Australian Formula 3 Championship class, which was open to cars constructed in accordance with the FIA Formula 3 regulations that applied in the year of manufacture between 1 January 1995 and 31 December 2001.
 The Yokohama Formula 3 Australia Trophy class, which was open to cars constructed in accordance with the FIA Formula 3 regulations that applied in the year of manufacture between 1 January 1995 and 31 December 1998.

Points system
Championship class points were awarded on a 20-15-12-10-8-6-4-3-2-1 basis to top ten placed Championship class drivers in each race. One additional point was awarded to the driver gaining pole position for the Championship class at each race and one additional point was awarded to the driver setting the fastest Championship class race lap in each race.

Trophy class points were awarded on a 20-15-12-10-8-6-4-3-2-1 basis to top ten placed Trophy class drivers in each race. One additional point was awarded to the driver gaining pole position for the Trophy class at each race and one additional point was awarded to the driver setting the fastest race Trophy class race lap in each race.

Manufacturers Championship points were awarded on a 20-15-12-10-8-6-4-3-2-1 basis to the recognized engine manufacturers of cars classified as finishers in each race, irrespective of class.
 1st Place points were awarded to the manufacturer of the engine of the race winning car.
 2nd Place points were awarded to the manufacturer of the engine of the best placed car with a brand of engine other than that of the race winning car.
 3rd Place points were awarded to the manufacturer of the engine of the best placed car with a brand of engine other than that awarded 1st Place or 2nd Place points for the race, and so forth.

Results

Australian Formula 3 Championship

Yokohama Formula 3 Australia Trophy

Australian Formula 3 Engine Manufacturers Championship

References

Australian Formula 3 seasons
Formula 3 Championship
Australia
Australian Formula 3